This is a list of Brazilian regents, a regent, from Latin regens, "one who reigns", is a person selected to act as head of state (ruling or not) because the ruler is a minor, not present, or debilitated.

Reign of Maria I

Reign of John VI

Reign of Pedro II
Regents during the minority of emperor Pedro II

The regencies took place from 1831 to 1840, between the abdication of Pedro I of Brazil until the majority of Pedro II legally declared by the Senate at the age of 14 on July 23, 1840.

Women heads of state during the Empire

In addition to the regencies listed above, two other people held the Head of State of Brazil during the imperial period, Maria Leopoldina and Isabel, Princess Imperial of Brazil. D. Leopoldina who acted as regent in 1822 and had a great influence on Brazil's independence process, having been responsible for signing the decree that separated Brazil from Portugal. 

D. Isabel, heir presumptive to the throne, who was Regent of Brazil in various periods (1870–1871, 1876–1877 and 1887–1888) while her father, Emperor Pedro II, performed foreign visits. During her last regency she sanctioned on 13 May 1888, the Golden Law (Imperial Law n.º 3.353) was the law that extinguished slavery in Brazil, considered a great milestone in the history of Brazil.

See also
Regency
List of regents
President of Brazil
Prime Minister of Brazil
Monarchy of Brazil
Regency period (Empire of Brazil)

Notes and references 

Brazil
Brazil
Heads of state of Brazil
Regents
Regents
Regents